is a gravity dam on the Tone River in Gunma Prefecture of Japan. It was constructed between 1951 and 1957. The dam itself supports a single Francis turbine hydroelectric generator with a 23 MW capacity which was commissioned in 1957. The reservoir created by the dam serves as the lower reservoir for the 1,200 Tamahara Pumped Storage Power Station which was commissioned in 1986.

See also

List of power stations in Japan
List of pumped-storage hydroelectric power stations

References

Dams in Gunma Prefecture
Hydroelectric power stations in Japan
Gravity dams
Dams completed in 1957